John Virgil Singleton Jr. (March 20, 1918 – March 20, 2015) was a United States district judge of the United States District Court for the Southern District of Texas.

Education and career

Born in Kaufman, Texas, Singleton received a Bachelor of Arts degree from the University of Texas at Austin in 1942. While at UT, he was a member of the Texas Cowboys service organization. He then served in the United States Navy as a Lieutenant Commander from 1942 to 1946, working in the Veterans Administration and graduated from the Naval Justice School in 1948. He was in private practice in Houston, Texas from 1946 to 1966.

Federal judicial service

On June 28, 1966, President Lyndon B. Johnson nominated Singleton to a new seat on the United States District Court for the Southern District of Texas created by 80 Stat. 75. He was confirmed by the United States Senate on July 22, 1966, and received his commission the same day. He served as Chief Judge from 1979 to 1988, and assumed senior status on April 1, 1988. He retired on June 1, 1992. He lived in the Lakes of Parkway community in western Houston, until his death on March 20, 2015, in Houston.

References

Sources
 

1918 births
2015 deaths
Judges of the United States District Court for the Southern District of Texas
People from Kaufman, Texas
United States district court judges appointed by Lyndon B. Johnson
20th-century American judges
University of Texas at Austin alumni
Texas Democrats